Loutraki (before 1922: Κάτω Πόζαρ - Kato Pozar, renamed until 1959: 
Κάτω Λουτράκιον - Kato Loutrakion) is a village in Pella regional unit, Macedonia, Greece.

Loutraki had 1066 inhabitants in 1981. In fieldwork done by Riki Van Boeschoten in late 1993, Loutraki was populated by Slavophones. The Macedonian language was used by people of all ages, both in public and private settings, and as the main language for interpersonal relationships. Some elderly villagers had little knowledge of Greek.

References

Populated places in Pella (regional unit)